Margareta Cordelia Cederschiöld (30 December 1879 – 29 July 1962) was a Swedish tennis player who competed in the 1912 Summer Olympics. She was eliminated in the quarter-finals of the outdoor singles. In the indoor singles she lost in the first round. In the indoor mixed doubles she and her partner Carl Kempe finished fourth without competing in the bronze medal match.

Her brother Hugo was an Olympic shooter.

References

1879 births
1962 deaths
Swedish female tennis players
Olympic tennis players of Sweden
Tennis players at the 1912 Summer Olympics
Tennis players from Stockholm

Margareta